Moo moo or variation, may refer to:

 Muumuu (aka moomoo), a loose dress of Hawaiian origin
 Moo Moo (Brooklyn Nine-Nine), a 2017 TV episode of Brooklyn Nine-Nine
 Moo Moo Restaurant, a chain of buffet restaurants in Moscow, Russia
 Moomoo, an American stock brokerage owned by Futu

See also

 Moo (disambiguation)
 Moo2 (disambiguation)